Qalandari may refer to:
 Qalandar, Ahar
 Qalandari, Hajjiabad, Hormozgan Province
 Qalandari, Khuzestan
 Qalandari, Yazd